The Festival Girls is a 1961 American drama film directed by Leigh Jason and starring Barbara Valentin, Alexander D'Arcy and Scilla Gabel. It was one of a number of low-budget exploitation films Austrian star Valentin appeared in during the early 1960s. Location shooting took place at several European film festivals. It premiered in West Germany in 1961, and first screened in the United States the following year. It had censorship issues in several American cities.

Synopsis
Larry Worthington, a down-on-his-luck film producer, discovers Valentine a young model who is rescued half-drowned from the sea outside his European hotel. He casts her in his latest film, which then wins top honours at the Venice Film Festival only to provoke the anger of Nadja.

Cast
 Barbara Valentin as Valentine
 Alexander D'Arcy as 	Larry Worthington
 Scilla Gabel as 	Nadja
 Alain Dijon as 	Dirk Vangard
 Eduard Linkers as 	Jerome
 Regina Seiffert as Liz
 Janez Cuk as Hotel Manager 
 Franek Trefalt as 	George
 Demeter Bitenc as 	Member of Jury
 Ute Böhnig as 	Starlet
 Anita Semmler as Starlet
 Helga Liotta as Starlet

References

Bibliography

External links
 

1961 films
1961 drama films
American drama films
Films directed by Leigh Jason
1960s exploitation films
1960s English-language films
1960s American films